Great Branch Teacherage, also known as Great Branch Rosenwald School Teacherage, is a historic home and teacherage located near Orangeburg, Orangeburg County, South Carolina. It was built in 1924–1925, was part of the Great Branch School Rosenwald school complex. It is a one-story, three-room, frame building with a lateral gable roof.  It is the only remaining building from the Great Branch School complex, which closed in 1954.

It was added to the National Register of Historic Places in 2007.

References

Teacherages
African-American history of South Carolina
Rosenwald schools in South Carolina
Houses on the National Register of Historic Places in South Carolina
Houses completed in 1925
Houses in Orangeburg County, South Carolina
National Register of Historic Places in Orangeburg County, South Carolina